María del Pilar (born 12 October 1954) is a Guatemalan long-distance runner. She competed in the women's marathon at the 1988 Summer Olympics.

References

1954 births
Living people
Athletes (track and field) at the 1988 Summer Olympics
Guatemalan female long-distance runners
Guatemalan female marathon runners
Olympic athletes of Guatemala
Place of birth missing (living people)